Nadvorna is a Hasidic rabbinical dynasty deriving its name from the town of Nadvorna, (Nadvirna), today in Ukraine.

The most famous rebbe of the dynasty was Mordechai Leifer of Nadvorna (the son of Rabbi Yissachar Dov Ber (Bertche) Leifer of Nadvorna), whose writings form the corpus of the group's Hasidic thought. He was raised by his great-uncle, Rebbe Meir II of Premishlan.

Yissachar Dov Ber (Bertche) Leifer of Nadvorna was a son of Rabbi Yitzchak of Kalish. Since many of the rebbes of the Nadvorna Dynasty (as in other rabbinic dynasties) married relatives, many of the rebbes in this list are sons-in-law of other rebbes on the list.

There are Nadvorna congregations in Israel, Brooklyn, London, and Bloomingburg, among others.

The mode of dress of Nadvorna rebbes is unique in that they typically wear a white gartel over a colorful bekishe, and a white crocheted Jerusalem-style kippah under their shtreimel.

Rebbes are known as "Admorim" (Hebrew אדמו"ר, which is the acronym for "אדונינו מורינו ורבינו", "Adoneinu Moreinu V'Rabeinu", "Our master, our teacher, and our rabbi").

Outline of the History of the Nadvorna Dynasty 
Grand Rabbi Israel Baal Shem Tov, founder of Hasidism

 Grand Rabbi Meir the Great of Premishlan (1703–1773), disciple of the Baal Shem Tov
 Grand Rabbi Uren Arye Leib of Premishlan (died 1813) disciple of Rabbi Yechiel Michl of Zlotshov; son of Rabbi Meir the GreatSee also Premishlan (Hasidic dynasty)
 Grand Rabbi Yitzchak of Kalish, son of Rabbi Uren Arye Leib of Premishlan
 Grand Rabbi Yissachar Dov Ber (Bertche) Leifer of Nadvorna (died 1848), author of Sisrei Torah, son of Rabbi Yitzchak of Kalish; disciple of Rabbi Yitzchak of Radvill; son-in-law of Rabbi Avrohom Leib Bloch of Nadvorna
 Grand Rabbi Aaron Leib Leifer of Nadvorna (1819–1897), was known as a great miracle worker and kabbalist, author of Yad Aharon, son of Rabbi Bertche
 Grand Rabbi Moshe Leifer of Nadvorna, son of Rabbi Aaron Leib
 Grand Rabbi Yitzchak Leifer of Hartz-Raman, son of Rabbi Aaron Leib
 Grand Rabbi Mordechai Leifer of Nadvorna (1824-1894), author of Mamar Mordechai, son of Rabbi Bertche
 Grand Rabbi Meir the Second of Premishlan (1783–1850), son of Rabbi Uren Arye Leib
 Grand Rabbi David of Kalish, son of Rabbi Meir the Great

Descendants of Rabbi Mordechai of Nadvorna 
 Grand Rabbi Yitzchak Leifer of Stanislaw, son of Rabbi Mordechai of Nadvorna
 Grand Rabbi Chaim Leifer of Stanislaw (murdered together with his entire family in the Holocaust) son of Rabbi Yitzchak Leifer of Stanislaw, and son law of Rabbi Meir Rosenbaum of Nadvorna-Kretshnif
 Grand Rabbi Yisachar Berel Leifer of Stanislaw, son of Rabbi Chaim Leifer of Stanislaw, and son in law of Rabbi Yissachar Dov Ber (Bertche) Leifer of Nadvorna-Satmar
 Grand Rabbi Yissachar Dov Ber (Bertche) Leifer of Nadvorna-Satmar (died 1906), Author of Likkutei Yissachar, son of Rabbi Mordechai of Nadvorna
 Grand Rabbi Meir Leifer of Cleveland (died 1941), son of Rabbi Yissachar Dov Ber (Bertche) of Nadvorna-Satmar, Author of Oros Hameirim, son in law of Rabbi Alter Zev Horowitz of Stryzov
 Grand Rabbi Isamar Leifer of Bushtina, son of Rabbi Yissachar Dov Ber (Bertche) of Nadvorna-Satmar, son in law of Rabbi Yisroel Chaim Freedman of Rachov
Grand Rabbi Aaron Moshe Leifer of Verdan, son of Rabbi Yissachar Dov (Bertche) of Nadvorna-Satmar, Author of Vayakhel Moshe.
 Grand Rabbi Mordechai Leifer of Bushtina, son of Rabbi Isamar of Bushtina
 Grand Rabbi Chaim Baruch Leifer of Bushtina in Canada, son of Rabbi Mordechai Leifer of Bushtina
 Grand Rabbi Isamar Leifer of Bushtina, son of Rabbi Mordechai Leifer of Bushtina
 Grand Rabbi Yissachar Ber Leifer of Bushtina Petah Tikva, son of Rebbe Mordechai Leifer of Bushtina
 Grand Rabbi David Leifer of Bania author of Ohev Chesed, son of Rabbi Yissachar Dov Ber (Bertche) of Nadvorna-Satmar
 Grand Rabbi Aaron Yechiel Leifer of Nadvorna-Safed, son of Rabbi David of Bania
 Grand Rabbi Mordechai Yitzchok Leifer of Kalish in the neighborhood Har Nof in Jerusalem, son of Rabbi Aaron Yechiel Leifer of Nadvorna-Safed, son in law of Rabbi David Moshe Rosenbaum of Kretshnif
 Grand Rabbi Yissachar Ber Pinchas Leifer of Nadvorna-Safed, son of Rabbi Aaron Yechiel
 Grand Rabbi Chaim Alter David of Nadvorna-Haifa, son of Rabbi Aaron Yechiel
 Grand Rabbi Moshe Meir Leifer of Yerushalayem, son of Rabbi Aaron Yechiel Leifer of Nadvorna-Safed
 Grand Rabbi Mordechai Leifer of Bania, son of Rabbi David Leifer of Bania
 Grand Rabbi Dovid Leifer of Bania in Monroe, son of Rabbi Mordechai Leifer of Bania
 Grand Rabbi Meir Menasha Leifer of Bania-Monsey, son of Rabbi Mordechai Leifer of Bania
 Grand Rabbi Yissachar Ber Leifer of Nadvorna-Hermanshtat in Boro Park, son of Rabbi David Leifer of Bania
 Grand Rabbi Mordechai Leifer of Nadvorna-Hermanshtat in Boro Park, son of Rabbi Yissachar Ber Leifer of Hermanshtat
 Grand Rabbi Meir Leifer of Lishensk, son of Rabbi Yissachar Ber Leifer of Hermanshtat
 Grand Rabbi Yosef Leifer of Pittsburg (1891–1966), author of Tzidkas Yosef, son of Rabbi Yissachar Dov Ber (Bertche) of Nadvorna-Satmar
 Grand Rabbi Avraham Abba Leifer (1916-1990) Pittsburger Rebbe of Newark and later Ashdod,  author of Emunas Avraham, son of Rabbi Yosef, and son-in-law of Rabbi Isamar of Nadvorna
 Grand Rabbi Mordechai Yissachar Ber Leifer of Pittsburg author of Pisgumei Oraysa, present Pittsburger Rebbe, son of Rabbi Avraham Abba
 Grand Rabbi Aharon Moshe Leifer of Grusvardein author of Vayakhel Moshe, son of Rabbi Yissachar Dov Ber (Bertche) of Nadvorna-Satmar
 Grand Rabbi Yoseph Leifer of Vardein-Flatbush author of Divrei Torah, son of Rabbi Aharon Moshe Leifer of Grusvardein, son in law of Rabbi Isaac Rosenbaum of Zutshka
 Grand Rabbi Shea Katz of Magrov Flatbush, son-in-law of Rabbi Yosef of Verdan
 Grand Rabbi Shalom Leifer of Brighton Beach, son of Rabbi Yissachar Dov Ber (Bertche) of Nadvorna-Satmar
 Grand Rabbi Shlomo Leifer of Nadvorna in Boro Park, son of Rabbi Shalom of Brighton Beach
 Rabbi Berel Leifer, Nadvorna Rav of Lakewood, son of Rabbi Shlomo Leifer of Nadvorna
 Rabbi Menashe Leifer, Nadvorna Rav of Williamsburg, son of Rabbi Shlomo Leifer of Nadvorna, son in law of Rabbi Yoseph Rosenbaum of Kalish
 Grand Rabbi Avrohm Abish Shmidman of Krula-Flatbush, son of Rabbi Yitzchok Eizik Leifer, son of Rabbi Shalom Leifer of Brighton Beach
 Grand Rabbi Meyer Rosenbaum of Nadvorna-Kretshnif (1852 - June 29 1908) son of Rabbi Mordechai Leifer (changed last name to Rosenbaum), son-in-law of Rabbi Yechiel Michel Tirer of Dorohoi
 Descendants of Grand Rabbi Meir Rosenbaum
 Grand Rabbi Aaron Moshe Leifer of Zalon-Lantzut, son of Rabbi Mordechai of Nadvorna, son in law of Rabbi Meir Reich of Reisha
 Grand Rabbi Avraham Mendel Leifer of Kolymaya (fondly known as the Bucher Rebbe) (d. 1917), son of Rabbi Aaron Moshe Leifer of Zalon-Lantzut
 Grand Rabbi Yisroel Yaakov Leifer of Chust(d. 1991), youngest son and successor of Rabbi Mordechai of Nadvorna, son in law of Rabbi Reuven Frankel of Melitz 
 Grand Rabbi Shmuel Shmelke Leifer of Chust (d. 2023), son of Rabbi Yisroel Yaakov
 Grand Rabbi Aharon Moshe Leifer of Chust, son of Rabbi Shmuel Shmelke
 Grand Rabbi Shmuel Shmelke Leifer of Chust, son of Rabbi Aharon Moshe of Chust
 Grand Rabbi Baruch Pinchos Leifer of Chust-Israel, son of Rabbi Aharon Moshe of Chust
 Grand Rabbi Yisroel Yaakov Leifer of Chust, son of Rabbi Aharon Moshe of Chust, Son in law of Rabbi Yosef of Verdan
 Grand Rabbi Dovid Leifer of Chust, son of Rabbi Yisroel Yaakov, and son in law of Rabbi Pinchas of Kechneye
 Grand Rabbi Yisachar Ber Leifer of Chust, son of Rabbi Yisroel Yaakov Leifer of Chust, son in law of his brother Rabbi Shmuel Shmelke Leifer of Chust
 Grand Rabbi Reuven Leifer of Grosvardein, son of Rabbi Yisroel Yaakov Leifer of Chust
 Grand Rabbi Dovid Leifer of Grosvardein, son of Rabbi Yisroel Yaakov Leifer of Chust, son in law of Rabbi Pinchas Shapiro of Kechneya
 Rabbi Sholom Ginzberg, Rabbi of Strozhnitz, son in law of Rabbi Yisroel Yaakov of Chust
 Rabbi Mordechai Ginzberg, son of Rabbi Sholom Ginzberg, Rabbi of Strozhnitz, author of Sefer Tiferes Mordechai.
Rabbi Yitzchok Pinchas Ginsberg (1898–1994), son of Rabbi Sholom Ginzberg, Rabbi of Strozhnitz - founder of the Kehillas Yitzchok synagogue and beit midrash in Los Angeles.   
Rabbi Sholom Ginsberg, current rebbe of Kehillas Yitzchok in Los Angeles. 
 Grand Rabbi Chaim Shlomie Sega"l Lowy of Chust-Tosh, son-in-law of Rabbi Yisroel Yaakov
 Grand Rabbi Meshulam Feish Ginsburg of Chust, grandson of Rabbi Chaim Shlomie Sega"l Lowy of Chust-Tosh
 Grand Rabbi Yehuda Halevi Tyrnauer of congregation Shomrei Shabbos, Boro Park, grandson of Rabbi of Chust
 Grand Rabbi Yoseph Leifer of Nirdhas, son of Rabbi Mordechai of Nadvorna, son in law of Rabbi Aryeh Leib Rubin of Ropshitz
 Grand Rabbi Moshe Menachem of Debrecen, son of Rabbi Yoseph Leifer of Nirdhas
 Grand Rabbi Yaakov Leifer of Nadvorna-Debrecen, son of Rabbi Yoseph Leifer of Nirdhas, son in law of Rabbi Aharon Moshe Zolynia-Lantzut
 Grand Rabbi Yitzchak of Lapash, author of Tferes Maraham, and of Sefer Hadoros Hachadash son of Rabbi Yaakov Leifer of Nadvorna Debrecen
 Grand Rabbi Yisachar Ber Leifer of Zolynia,(1920–2008) son Rabbi Yaakov Leifer of Debrecen, and son in law of Rabbi Issamar of Bushtina
 Grand Rabbi Yaakov Leifer of Zolynia son of Rabbi Yisachar Ber Leifer of Zolynia, son in law of Rabbi Yozeph of Liska
 Grand Rabbi Chaim Mordechai Aharon Moshe of Nadvorna-England son of Rabbi Yisachar Ber Leifer of Zolynia
 Grand Rabbi Yitzchak Leifer of Bronx, son of Rabbi Yoseph Leifer of Nirdhas, son in law of Rabbi Yissachar Dov Ber (Bertche) of Nadvorna-Satmar
 Grand Rabbi Avraham Yoseph Igra of Zolynia author of Toldos Avraham Yoseph, son in law of Rabbi Mordechai of Nadvorna

Reb Yosef of Borsha 
 Grand Rabbi Yoseph Leifer of Borsha, he knew the entire Zohar by heart, son of Rabbi Bertche, son-in-law of Rabbi Mordechai Kahane of Borsha
 Grand Rabbi Yissachar Dov Ber (Bertche) Leifer of Ungvar, son of Rabbi Yoseph
 Grand Rabbi Yechiel Leifer of Mihalowitz, son of Rabbi Yoseph
 Grand Rabbi Levi Yitzchak Leifer of Nadvorna-Haifa (died 1961), son of Rabbi Yechiel
 Grand Rabbi Aaron Aryeh Leifer of Nadvorna-Temashvar (died 1963), son of Rabbi Yechiel
 Grand Rabbi Leifer of Nadvorna-Temashvar, son of Rabbi Aaron Aryeh
 Grand Rabbi Yoseph Leifer of Nadvorna-Petah Tikva (1921–2002) son of Rabbi Aaron Aryeh
 Grand Rabbi Yitzchok Leifer, oldest son of Rabbi Yoseph of Petah Tikva
 Grand Rabbi Chaim Leifer, son of Rabbi Yoseph of Petah Tikva
 Grand Rabbi Binyamin Leifer, son of Rabbi Yoseph of Petah Tikva
 Grand Rabbi Yisachar Ber Leifer, son of Rabbi Yoseph of Petah Tikva
 Grand Rabbi Meir Leifer, son of Rabbi Yoseph of Petah Tikva
 Grand Rabbi Aaron Aryeh Leifer, son of Rabbi Yoseph of Petah Tikva

Rabbi Meir of Kretshnif-Nadvorna 
Descendants of Rabbi Meir
 Grand Rabbi Meir Rosenbaum of Nadvorna-Kretshnif (1852 - June 29 1908) son of Rabbi Mordechai Leifer (changed last name to Rosenbaum), son-in-law of Rabbi Yechiel Michel Tirer of Dorohoi
 Grand Rabbi Shlomo Isaacson, Romaner Rebbe, son-in-law of Rabbi Meir of Kretshnif
 Grand Rabbi Yisachar Ber Isaacson of Polyina, son of Rabbi Shlomo Isaacson the Romaner Rebbe, and son-in-law of Rabbi Yisroel Chaim Friedman of Rachov,
 Grand Rabbi Yechiel Yehuda Isaacson Of Achuza, son of Rabbi Yisachar Ber Isaacson of Polyina, son-in-law of Rabbi Chaim Tzvi Teitelbaum of Sighet,
 Grand Rabbi Yisroel (Isaacson) Leifer of Nirdhas, son of Rabbi Shlomo Isaacson, Romaner Rebbe, son-in-law of Rabbi Yoseph Leifer of Nirdhas,
 Grand Rabbi Meir Isaacson, Romaner Rebbe of Philadelphia and later Staten Island, son of Rabbi Shlomo, and son-in-law of Rabbi Issamar of Nadvorna
 Grand Rabbi Chaim Shulem Isaacson, son of Rabbi Meir of Roman, of Philadelphia
 Grand Rabbi Shlomo Isaacson of Passaic, New Jersey, son of Rabbi Meir Of Roman
 Grand Rabbi Berel Isaacson of Staten Island, son of Rabbi Meir Isaacson of Roman
 Grand Rabbi Yaakov Yisachar Ber Rosenbaum of Slotvina-Sighet, son of Rabbi Meir Rosenbaum of Nadvorna-Kretshnif and son-in-law of Rabbi Aaron Moshe Leifer of Zalon-Lantzut
 Grand Rabbi Chaim Mordechai of Mishkoltz, son of Rabbi Yaakov Yisachar Ber Rosenbaum of Slotvina-Sighet
 Grand Rabbi Meir of Reisha, son of Rabbi Yaakov Yisachar Ber Rosenbaum of Slotvina-Sighet
 Grand Rabbi Yitzchak of Sighet, author of Minchas Yitzchak, and Bishilei Hapri, son of Rabbi Yaakov Yisachar Ber Rosenbaum of Slotvina Sighet, son-in-law of Rabbi Yaakov Leifer of Nadvorna-Debrecen
 Grand Rabbi Issamar Rosenbaum of Nadvorna, known as "Ha’admor Hazaken MiNadvorna" (1886–1973), son of Rabbi Meir of Kretshnif, son-in-law of Grand Rabbi Isaiah Rubin of Kolbasov
 Grand Rabbi Chaim Mordechai Rosenbaum of Nadvorna-Bnei Brak (1903–1976), son of Rabbi Issamar of Chernovitz-Nadvorna, son-in-law of Rabbi Elazar Zev of Kretshnif
 Grand Rabbi Yaakov Yisachar Ber Rosenbaum of Nadvorna-Bnei Brak (died Thursday, March 1, 2012 at Beilinson Hospital), son of Rabbi Chaim Mordechai. On May 22, 2015 a 65-year-old woman gave birth to her first child. It has been reported that Rabbi Yaakov Yisachar Ber Rosenbaum prior to his death blessed the couple with a child.
 Grand Rabbi Yesochor Ber Rosenbaum (1905-1981), Strozhnitzer Rebbe in Boro Park, author of Divrei Yissachar, son of Rabbi Issamar Rosenbaum of Nadvorna, son-in-law of Rabbi Yissachar Dov Ber (Bertche) Leifer of Nadvorna-Satmar
 Grand Rabbi Usher Mordechai Rosenbaum of Cleveland-Strozhnitz (died 1991) author of Sifsei Reim, son of Rabbi Yesochor Ber, and son-in-law of Rabbi Meir Leifer of Cleveland
 Grand Rabbi Meir Yoseph Rosenbaum of Strozhnitz, son of Rabbi Usher Mordechai Rosenbaum of Cleveland-Stroznitz 
 Grand Rabbi Yehoshua Heschel Rosenbaum of Cleveland present Clevelander Rebbe of Williamsburg, Brooklyn, son of Rabbi Usher Mordechai Rosenbaum of Cleveland-Stroznitz
 Rabbi Yitzchak Isaac Rosenbaum of Strozhnitz in Stamford Hill, London, son of Rabbi Usher Mordechai
 Grand Rabbi Alter Zev Rosenbaum of Nadvorna-Williamsburg, son of Rabbi Usher Mordechai Rosenbaum of Cleveland-Stroznitz
 Grand Rabbi Meir Rosenbaum of Mosholu, son of Rabbi Yisachar Ber of Stroznitz
 Grand Rabbi Duvid Rosenbaum of Kolbosov, from Williamsburg, Brooklyn, son of Rabbi Meir of Mosholu
 Grand Rabbi Usher Mordechai Rosenbaum of Mosholu, present Mosholu Rebbe of Boro Park, son of Rabbi Meir.
 Grand Rabbi Yitzchak Rosenbaum of Cleveland-Raanana, (1932-2020) Clevelander Rebbe of Raanana, son of Rabbi Yisachar Ber of Strozhnitz
 Grand Rabbi Yosef Rosenbaum of Kalish, Kalisher Rebbe of Flatbush, Brooklyn, son of Rabbi Yisachar Ber of Stroznitz (died 2019)
 Grand Rabbi Yechiel Mechel Rosenbaum of Kalish, (Kalisher Rebbe) (Kalish Rebbe), Kalish is a Hasidic dynasty from Europe and is now the rabbi of a hasidic dynasty and shul named Ginzai Yosef Kalish located at 1305 Ave R Brooklyn ny 11229. He also runs Yeshiva Tiferes Mordechai Kalish on the name of his grandfather Grand Rabbi Mordechai Leifer of Nadvorna.he is a son of Rabbi Yosef Rosenbaum.
 Grand Rabbi Yitzchok Isaac Rosenbaum (January 18, 1908 - July 20, 2000) of Zutshka (near Chernivtsi) and later Bnei Brak, son of Rabbi Issamar of Nadvorna and son-in-law of Rabbi Noson Dovid Hollander (d. 1838), Amasna Rav
 Grand Rabbi Nathan David Rosenbaum of Zutshka, previous Zutshker Rebbe, son of Rabbi Yitzchok
 Grand Rabbi Meir Rosenbaum of Caracas, son of Rabbi Isaac of Zutshka
 Grand Rabbi Yaakov Rosenbaum, son of Rabbi Meir.  Zutshka-Caracas Rebbe and Resident shochet in Kiryas Tosh
 Grand Rabbi Zeide Yisrael Chaim Yoel Rosenbaum, son of Rabbi Yaakov.  Nadvorna Rebbe of Bloomingburg, NY
 Grand Rabbi Burech Rosenbaum of Nanash-Williamsburg, son of Rabbi Meir Rosenbaum of Caracas
 Grand Rabbi Israel Rosenbaum of Stanislaw-Monsey (Shavuos 1931 - November 8, 2009), son of Rabbi Isaac of Zutshka and son-in-law of Rabbi Menachem Shlomo Taub (1901‑1978), Kaliver Rebbe and author of Chakal Tapuchin
 Rabbi Meir Rosenbaum, Chief Rabbi of Cuba and Mexico, son of Rabbi Isamar of Nadvorna
 Grand Rabbi Asher Yeshaya Rosenbaum of Nadvorna-Hadera, son of Rabbi Issamar of Nadvorna, son-in-law of his brother Rabbi Isaac Rosenbaum of Zutshka
 Grand Rabbi Berel Rosenbaum of Linsk-Williamsburg, son of Rabbi Asher Yeshaya Rosenbaum of Nadvorna-Hadera
 Grand Rabbi Eliezer Zev of Kretshnif (murdered at Auschwitz, 1944) author of Raza Dshabbos, son of Rabbi Meir of Kretshnif
 Grand Rabbi Nissan Chaim Rosenbaum of Bradshin, son of Rabbi Eliezer Zev of Kretshnif
 Grand Rabbi Tzvi Hirsch Rosenbaum of Kretshnif-Sighet (1920–2006) in Jerusalem, son of Rabbi Nissan Chaim of Bradshin, son-in-law of Rabbi Chaim Mordechai Rosenbaum of Nadvorna
 Grand Rabbi Nissan Chaim Rosenbaum of Kretshnif-Israel, son of Rabbi Tzvi Hirsch Rosenbaum of Kretshnif-Sighet in Jerusalem,
 Grand Rabbi Zeidel Rosenbaum of Kretshnif-New York, son of Rabbi Tzvi Hirsch Rosenbaum of Kretshnif-Sighet,
 Grand Rabbi Shmuel Shmelke Rosenbaum of Bitschkov, son of Rabbi Eliezer Zev of Kretshnif, son-in-law of Rabbi Pinchas Shapiro of Kechneya
 Grand Rabbi Mordechai Rosenbaum of Pest, son of Rabbi Eliezer Zev of Kretshnif, son-in-law of Rabbi Yaakov Leifer of Nadvorna-Debrecen
 Grand Rabbi Meir Rosenbaum of Nadvorna-Satmar, son of Rabbi Eliezer Zev of Kretshnif, son in law of Rabbi Yissachar Dov Ber (Bertche) Leifer of Nadvorna-Satmar
 Grand Rabbi David Moshe Rosenbaum of Kretshnif (died 1969), son of Rabbi Eliezer Zev, son-in-law of Rabbi Chaim Mordechai of Nadvorna
 Grand Rabbi Menachem Elazar Zev Rosenbaum of Kretshnif-Rechovot, present Rebbe of Kretshnif-Rechovot, son of Rabbi David Moshe
 Grand Rabbi Yisroel Nisan Rosenbaum of Kretshnif, present Rebbe of Kretshnif-Kiryat Gat, son of Rabbi David Moshe
 Grand Rabbi Zeyda Shmuel Shmelke Rosenbaum of Bitschkov in Jaffa, son of Rabbi David Moshe
 Grand Rabbi Meir Rosenbaum of Premishlan, present Premishlaner Rebbe, son of Rabbi David Moshe of Kretshnif
 Grand Rabbi Yosef Shlomo Rosenbaum of Kretshnif-Monsey, son of Rabbi David Moshe of Kretshnif and son-in-law of Rabbi Israel Rosenbaum of Stanislaw
 Grand Rabbi Mordechai Rosenbaum of Rachov (murdered at Auschwitz, 25 May 1944), son of Rabbi Meir Rosenbaum of Kretshnif
 Grand Rabbi Yitzchak Rosenbaum of Rachov (murdered at Auschwitz, 25 May 1944) son of Rabbi Meir Rosenbaum of Kretshnif
 Grand Rabbi Meir of Drubitch, son of Rabbi Yitzchak Rosenbaum of Rachov
 Grand Rabbi Elazar Zev Rosenbaum of Rachov, son of Rabbi Yitzchak Rosenbaum of Rachov, son in law of Rabbi Chaim Mordechai Rosenbaum of 'Nadvorna'
 Grand Rabbi Pinchas Shapiro of Kechneya (murdered at Auschwitz, 25 May 1944) author of Tzofnas Paneach, son-in-law of Rabbi Meir Rosenbaum of Kretshnif
 Grand Rabbi Sholom Yesochor Dov Shapiro (1900-1957), Kechina Rebbe of Novisalitz, Romania, son of Rabbi Pinchas Shapiro of Kechneya, and son-in-law of Rabbi Issamar Rosenbaum of 'Nadvorna'
 Rabbi Esriel Rubin of Dombrova scion of the Ropshitz Hasidic dynasty, son-in-law of Grand Rabbi Yisachar Ber Shapiro of Kechneya
 Grand Rabbi Naftoli Tzvi Rubin of Dombrova, son of Rabbi Esriel Rubin and son-in law of Rabbi Meir Rosenbaum of Caracas
 Grand Rabbi Isaac Taub of Kalov, son in law of Rabbi Pinchas Shapiro of Kechneya

Kiryat Nadvorna

Kiryat Nadvorna is a neighborhood in southeastern Bnei Brak that serves as the world center of the Nadvorna Chassidus and the quarters of some of its Hasidim.

The Nadvorna Chassidic Center
The Nadvorna Chassidic Center is the official name of the Beit Midrash and the central synagogue and the institutions of Nadvorna Chassidut in Kiryat Nadvorna in Bnei Brak. One of the largest synagogues in Bnei Brak.

The Beit Midrash is visible from many places in the city. The Rebbe's house was built next to the Beit Midrash building. The synagogue is located between the Admor of Nadvorna, Chiddushei HaRim and Chazon Ish streets.

Zutschka

Zutshka is a Hasidic court from the house of Nadvorna. The first Rebbe was Rabbi Yitzchak Isaac Rosenbaum.

Rabbi Yitzchak Isaac Rosenbaum
Rabbi Yitzchak Isaac Rosenbaum (18 January 1896 - July 20, 2000) was the Admor of Zutshka.

Rabbi Natan David Rosenbaum
Rabbi Natan David Rosenbaum (May 15, 1945 - February 2, 2019). He was the Admor of Zutshka.

Other descendants 
Descendants of Mordechai of Nadvorna who are not rebbes include:

 MK Rabbi Shmuel Halpert, of the Knesset in the State of Israel, who is a Grandson of Rebbe Shmuel Shmelka of Chust
 Yosef Reinman, a rabbinical scholar and author, a grandson (by marriage) of Rebbe Meir of Kretshnif.
 Rabbi Issamar Ginzberg, Nadvorna-Kechnia Rebbe

References 
 I Alfasi, החסידות מדור לדור Hachasidut miDor leDor, Jerusalem 1995, pp 78–87

External links 
 Videos of Nadvorna Rebbe of Bnei Brak
 The Nadvorna Rebbe of Bnei Brak making a shivah call to the Kretshnifer Rebbes of Jerusalem and Williamsburg, scions of the Nadvorna Dynasty
 Nadvorna Rebbe of Bnei Brak dancing at a Wedding
 Read Sefer Ma'amar Mordechai by Grand Rabbi Mordechai Leifer of Nadvorna
 Sefer Tferes Maraham by Rabbi Yitzchak Leifer by Hebrew - PDF file
 Machon Torah Vechaim - Nadvorna Dynasty Book Publishers

Hasidic dynasties headquartered in Jerusalem
Jewish Galician (Eastern Europe) history
Jewish Hungarian history
Jewish Romanian history
Maramureș
Nadvirna